Three men from South Africa competed at the 2006 Winter Olympics in Turin, Italy.
One of them, Alexander Heath, became the first African to compete in all 5 alpine events. The three-man South African team was the largest from the continent in Turin.

Alpine skiing 

Alexander Heath, competing in his third Olympics, qualified in all five events, with his best finish a 27th in the giant slalom.

Note: In the men's combined, run 1 is the downhill, and runs 2 and 3 are the slalom. In the women's combined, run 1 and 2 are the slalom, and run 3 the downhill.

Cross-country skiing 

Kraas competed in three events in Turin, but finished in only one, the sprint, where he finished 57th out of 80 competitors.

Distance

Sprint

Skeleton 

Tyler Botha finished second in a pair of Challenge Cup events that allowed him to qualify for the Games, where he ended up in 21st place.

References 

Nations at the 2006 Winter Olympics
2006
Winter Olympics